The 1999 Citrix Tennis Championships was an ATP men's tennis tournament held in Delray Beach, Florida, United States that was part of the World Series of the 1999 ATP Tour. It was the seventh edition of the tournament and was held from May 3 to May 10, 1999. Sixth-seeded Lleyton Hewitt won the singles title.

Finals

Singles

 Lleyton Hewitt defeated  Xavier Malisse 6–4, 6–7(2–7), 6–1
 It was Hewitt's only singles title of the year and the 2nd of his career.

Doubles

 Max Mirnyi /  Nenad Zimonjić defeated  Doug Flach /  Brian MacPhie 7–6(7–3), 3–6, 6–3
 It was Mirnyi's 4th title of the year and the 5th of his career. It was Zimonjić's only title of the year and the 1st of his career.

References

External links
 ITF tournament edition details

Delray Beach International Tennis Championships
Delray Beach Open
Citrix Tennis Championships
Citrix Tennis Championships
Citrix Tennis Championships
1999 Citrix Tennis Championships